Jean Michelin may refer to:

 Jean Michelin (painter, born 1571) (about 1571–1641), French Protestant painter, also called Jean I Michelin
 Jean Michelin (painter, born 1616) (about 1616–1670), French Protestant painter, also called Jean II Michelin
 Jean Michelin (painter, born 1623) (about 1623–1696), French Protestant painter, also called Jean III Michelin, Huguenot and court painter in Hanover